Tetiana Ustiuzhanina (Tatjana Ustiujanina, born 6 May 1965 in Zhdanov) is a Ukrainian competitive rower.
She competed for the Unified Team at the 1992 Summer Olympics, winning a bronze medal as a member of the women's quadruple sculls team. Ustiuzhanina also competed for Ukraine at the 1996 Summer Olympics and the 2000 Summer Olympics.

See also 
 Unified Team at the 1992 Summer Olympics#Rowing
 Ukraine at the 1996 Summer Olympics#Rowing
 Ukraine at the 2000 Summer Olympics#Rowing

References 

1965 births
Living people
Sportspeople from Mariupol
Ukrainian female rowers
Rowers at the 1992 Summer Olympics
Rowers at the 1996 Summer Olympics
Rowers at the 2000 Summer Olympics
Olympic bronze medalists for the Unified Team
Olympic rowers of the Unified Team
Olympic rowers of Ukraine
Olympic medalists in rowing
World Rowing Championships medalists for the Soviet Union
Medalists at the 1992 Summer Olympics